Under the Sand is a 2000 French drama film directed and written by François Ozon. The film was nominated for three César Awards and was critically well received. It stars Charlotte Rampling and Bruno Cremer.

Cast
Charlotte Rampling as Marie Drillon 
Bruno Cremer as Jean Drillon 
Jacques Nolot as Vincent 
Alexandra Stewart as Amanda 
Pierre Vernier as Gérard 
Andrée Tainsy as Suzanne

Plot
Marie is an English professor at a Parisian university. She has been happily married to Jean for 25 years. They vacation in the Landes, where his family has a house. At the beach, he goes for a swim while she sunbathes and later falls asleep. He never returns. There are no witnesses to any accident, and his body cannot be found; he may have committed suicide, he may have drowned in an accident. Marie does not accept his death, and she keeps seeing him (perhaps an apparition) after her return to Paris.

Marie begins an affair, even while she denies her husband's death, though she receives a call from the Landes police, saying a body had been found in a fisherman's net. Her friends are worried about her mental health, and when her lover offers her his help, she says he can't measure up to Jean, and rejects him. When visiting Jean's mother, who lives in a nursing home, she tells her that Jean may have killed himself; her mother in law rejects that, and says he probably left her because he was bored with her, and because, she says, she could not give him children. Finally, she goes to Landes to meet with the local officials. She is told he probably drowned while struggling with the undertow. The body, however, has spent so much time under water that it is putrefied and cannot be easily identified; a genetic test shows 90% correspondence with his mother, and the dental records seem to match as well. The lack of any past occurrence of fractures stop them from matching through skeletal analysis. She insists on seeing the body and reacts with horror. They found a watch as well: she denies that it his. When she goes back to the beach where he disappeared, she sees him in the distance and runs toward him or what she believes is him.

Production

The film was shot in Paris and in the Landes department including Lit-et-Mixe, Mimizan-Plage beach and at Saint-Julien-en-Born.

Awards
Sous le sable was nominated for Best Film at the César Awards 2002. It also earned Best Director and Best Actress César nominations for Ozon and Rampling.

Reception
On review aggregator website Rotten Tomatoes, the film has a rating of 93% based on 73 critics, with an average rating of 7.5/10.

The Swedish filmmaker Ingmar Bergman admired Sous le sable, claimed that he watched the film several times.

The film was listed as The New York Timess Critic's Pick by A. O. Scott, who said that "Ozon gives the movie to Ms. Rampling, whose performance is like a perfectly executed piano étude".

Varietys Derek Elley called the film "An exquisite reflection on personal bereavement", and called Charlotte Rampling's performance as "career-best". He then went on saying that "Under the Sand reps a hard commercial sell but could unearth solid niche business with critical support and devoted distrib[ution]s".

Marjorie Baumgarten of The Austin Chronicle called film's director "a rare talent", while Lisa Schwarzbaum of Entertainment Weekly awarded the film with a "B+" score and called Rampling a "magnificent, coolly alluring fifty-something siren".

According to Ed Gonzalez of Slant Magazine, "[Under the Sand] is fraught with all sorts of erotic displacements and rituals of denial".

References

External links

NY Times review

French drama films
2000 drama films
2000 films
Films directed by François Ozon
Films shot in Paris
2000s French-language films
2000s French films